Pop Music/False B-Sides is a compilation album by American electronic musician Baths. It was released during his 2011 tour.

In an interview with Blue Indian, Baths stated, "It’s original songs that happened after Cerulean. It’s sort of like an umbrella release for all those different things."

Track listing

References

External links

2011 compilation albums
Anticon albums
Baths (musician) albums